John Nicholas Robins Ryder (5 April 1814 – 27 March 1885) was an English actor.

Engaged by W. C. Macready, he played in most of Macready's productions, including As You Like It, at Drury Lane Theatre from 1842. He also toured with Macready to America in 1843 and 1849

In the 1850s he played in many of Charles Kean's productions at the Princes Theatre.

With a large number of appearances across the London stage, he was noted for his powerful voice, height and imposing physique.

He died at Brixton and was buried at West Norwood Cemetery.

References
 http://www.arthurlloyd.co.uk/QueensLongacre.htm
 Ryder, John Nicholas Robins (1814–1885), Joseph Knight, Oxford Dictionary of National Biography, 2004

English male stage actors
1814 births
1885 deaths
Burials at West Norwood Cemetery
19th-century English male actors